Juan Abreu (1904 – death date unknown) was a Cuban outfielder in the Negro leagues in the 1930s.

A native of Cienfuegos, Cuba, Abreu played for the Cuban Stars (East) for several seasons between 1930 and 1937.

References

External links
 and Seamheads

1904 births
Date of birth missing
Year of death missing
Place of death missing
Cuban Stars (East) players
Baseball outfielders
People from Cienfuegos
Cuban expatriate baseball players in the United States